The Northwestern Bloc of the Revolutionary Armed Forces of Colombia, also known as the Iván Ríos Bloc has historically been a strong influence in the Medellín and Antioquia regions, and still is today.  It has been among the blocs most seriously targeted by former president Álvaro Uribe's defense plan and the Colombian Army's offensive.  Due to this, the bloc has been forced to retreat to more remote areas of the countryside and has lost the dominance it once had in the area.  The specific divisions of the group are arguable. Because of the current conflict existing in the country, much of the information recovered is conflicting. Some of the believed divisions or "fronts", as they are commonly called, are shown below. Many of these fronts sometimes work together towards a certain mission, while others are further divided into "columns" and "companies" with a smaller number of members. For more general information see FARC-EP Chain of Command.

Commanders

Columna móvil Mario Vélez 
This mobile column is composed of around 300 members. It operates mainly in el Nudo de Paramillo, Yarumal, Valdivia and Anorí.

5th Front 

Also known as the Antonio Nariño Front, this front is composed by up to 350 combatants and operates mostly in the Urabá region of the Antioquia Department.

9th Front 

Also known as the Atanasio Girardot Front, this front is composed 45 to 50 combatants and operates mostly in the Antioquia Department.  The Colombian military claims that this front has now been dismantled but NGO Nuevo Arco Iris said in 2012 the front is still active

18th Front 

This front is composed by up to 150 combatants and operates mostly in the Córdoba Department.

34th Front 

Also known as the Alberto Martínez Front, this front is composed by up to 250 combatants and operates mostly in the Chocó and Antioquia Departments.

36th Front 

This front is composed by up to 160 combatants and operates mostly in the Antioquia Department.

47th Front 

Also known as the Leonardo Posada Pedraza Front, this front is composed by 15 to 90 combatants and operates mostly in the Caldas and Antioquia Departments. The front is, as of 2011, mainly active in the border between southern Antioquia and Caldas, with limited, if any, activity in other departments.

On May 19, 2008, Karina surrendered herself to the Colombian authorities, two weeks after president Uribe guaranteed her safety on her surrender. According to the governor of Antioquia, Luis Alfredo Ramos, she was also urged by her family to surrender.

57th Front 

This front is composed by up to 250 combatants, and operates mostly in the Chocó Department.

58th Front 

Also known as the Mártires de las Canas Front, this front is composed by up to 150 combatants and operates mostly in the Antioquia and Córdoba Departments.

Jacobo Arenas Urban Front 

This urban front is considered FARC's greatest influence in the Medellín region.

Raúl Eduardo Mahecha Front 
Operates in Antioquia. In September 2011 this front is believed to have rescued three oil workers who were kidnapped by criminals in August 2011. The guerrillas freed the workers and handed them over the Colombian police.

Columns and Companies 

The following columns and companies also form part of the Northwestern Bloc:

Company Aurelio Rodríguez:  Composed by up to 110 combatants, this company operates in the Risaralda and Caldas Departments and is led by Martín Cruz Vega, alias "Rubin Morro".  One of its highest ranking militants, Jesús González Cardona, alias "Osama", was captured in 2007.
Company Héroes y Mártires del Cairo operates in the Antioquia Department.

See also

References 

FARC